Pont de la Concorde may refer to:

 Pont de la Concorde (Paris), a bridge crossing the Seine
 Pont de la Concorde (Montreal), a bridge crossing the St. Lawrence